Aziz Shittu Jr. (born July 27, 1994) is a former American football defensive tackle. He played college football at Stanford. He was a member of the Philadelphia Eagles in 2017 when the team won Super Bowl LII. He has also played for the Dallas Cowboys. On April 11, 2020, Shittu joined the University of Colorado as a defensive graduate assistant coach.

College career

Recruiting

College career summary
In four years at Stanford University, Shittu had 78 total tackles, including a 10-tackle, two-sack game against Iowa in the Rose Bowl his senior year. In his senior year, Shittu received multiple accolades for his play, including All-Pac-12 first-team, Pac-12 All-Academic first-team, Associated Press All-Pac-12 first-team, and Phil Steele All-Pac-12 second-team. He was named the Most Outstanding Defensive Player for his play in Stanford's win in the 2016 Rose Bowl.

In his junior year, Shittu was selected to the All-Academic Pac-12 first-team, and in his senior year, he was selected to the All-Academic Pac-12 second-team. During his first two years, he received honorable mention for his academics.

College statistics

Professional career

Philadelphia Eagles
Shittu signed with the Philadelphia Eagles as an undrafted free agent on May 5, 2016. He was waived on September 3, 2016 and was signed to the Eagles' practice squad the next day. After spending his entire rookie season on the practice squad, he signed a reserve/future contract with the Eagles on January 2, 2017.

On May 2, 2017, Shittu was waived/injured by the Eagles with a knee injury and was placed on injured reserve. Shittu won Super Bowl LII when the Eagles defeated the New England Patriots 41-33.

On September 1, 2018, Shittu was waived by the Eagles.

Dallas Cowboys
On September 5, 2018, Shittu was signed to the Dallas Cowboys' practice squad. He was released on September 18, 2018. He was re-signed on November 14, 2018. He signed a reserve/future contract with the Cowboys on January 15, 2019.

On April 10, 2019, the Cowboys waived Shittu.

Philadelphia Eagles (second stint)
On August 13, 2019, Shittu was signed by the Philadelphia Eagles. He was placed on injured reserve on August 31, 2019. He was waived from injured reserve on October 5, 2019.

References

External links
 Stanford Cardinal bio
 NFL bio
 Philadelphia Eagles bio

1994 births
Living people
People from Atwater, California
People from Merced, California
Players of American football from California
American football defensive tackles
Stanford Cardinal football players
Philadelphia Eagles players
Dallas Cowboys players
Colorado Buffaloes football coaches